"Two Hussars" ("Два гусара" ["Dva gusara"]) is a novella by Leo Tolstoy published in 1856, and translated into English by Nathan Haskell Dole.  This is a novel in which one generation struggles against an earlier generation, or Tolstoy's generation is in struggle against that of his fathers.  Tolstoy translator Aylmer Maude describes the text as a "a rollicking tale with flashes of humor resembling  Charles Lever's."  Russian and Soviet literary scholar Boris Eikhenbaum has suggested that the introduction to Two Hussars was actually intended to be in The Decembrists, the incomplete novel that was supposed to be the following installment of War and Peace.

Publication History

It has frequently been republished as a companion text to the novella Polikúshka, in 1950 and 2010.

See also
 Bibliography of Leo Tolstoy

References

External links
 Original Text
 Two Hussars, from RevoltLib.com
 Two Hussars, from Marxists.org
 Two Hussars, from TheAnarchistLibrary.org

Short stories by Leo Tolstoy
1856 short stories